Carondelet Park, established in 1875, is the third largest park in the city of St. Louis, Missouri. Loughborough Avenue is the park's southern boundary; its northern boundary is Holly Hills Boulevard. The park takes its name from Carondelet, St. Louis. The Carondelet, Holly Hills, Boulevard Heights, and Bevo Mill neighborhoods surround the park, and the park is a focal point for the community.

Among other features, the park contains two lakes that are stocked for fishing, tennis courts, softball, baseball, and soccer fields. The park also has playgrounds, a recycling center (with mulch and compost), picnic areas, and a  bicycle path. The Alexander Lyle house, a historic home dated around 1840, is located on the property.

A community recreation center is on the eastern edge of the park adjacent to I-55.

According to resident historian Steven Strohmeyer, the park is home to the White Wall, a large concrete wall, white in color, where a local underground fight club met in the early 1980s.

See also
Grand Boulevard (St. Louis)
Forest Park
Tower Grove Park

References

External links  
Carondelet Park website
Holly Hills neighborhood website
Southside Journal story "Neighbors Anticipate Fun Times at Recplex"

Parks in St. Louis
Urban public parks
Tourist attractions in St. Louis
1875 establishments in Missouri